The McCain Institute for International Leadership is a Washington, D.C.-based think tank in cooperation with Arizona State University whose mission is to "advance leadership based on security, economic opportunity, freedom, and human dignity, in the United States and around the world."  The institute was formed in 2012 and is named after U.S. Senator and 2008 Republican Party presidential nominee John McCain from Arizona. Based in Washington, D.C., the McCain Institute is part of Arizona State University. The executive director of the McCain Institute is Evelyn Farkas, an American national security advisor, author, and foreign policy analyst.

Goals
Its work is focused on achieving immediate and long-range impact, through activities that improve the ability of leaders to make enlightened decisions in pursuit of the American and global interest. The work has four central themes:
 Provide decision recommendations for leaders through open debate and rigorous analysis, by convening experts, publishing policy-relevant research, and holding decision-making exercises using advanced technology.
 Identify and train new national security leaders, both American and foreign, in the public, private enterprise, and military spheres, including through fellowships and targeted training.
 Play a unique role in a crowded intellectual space, including through the Sedona Forum and the McCain Debates and by serving as a Washington  "decision tank".
 Promote and preserve the McCain family spirit of character-driven leadership and national service, including hosting the McCain family archives.

Funding
Funding of the institute comes from a variety of individuals, foundations, and corporations, including Wal-Mart Stores, FedEx, Saudi Arabia, and hedge fund owner Paul E. Singer.  Some of the funders have business before Congress, but during his life McCain's representative said such actions would not affect his votes.

Initiatives

Sedona Forum

The Sedona Forum is the institute's annual high-level  gathering of national and international leaders held each spring at the Enchantment Resort in the red-rock country of Sedona, Arizona. The forum convenes global leaders, decision-makers, high-level executives, activists, and diverse experts to discuss  solutions to real-world problems—all from the starting assumption of character-driven leadership and core democratic values.  Previous guests have included Vice President Joe Biden, Ben Affleck, former U.S. Secretary of State Hillary Clinton. The McCain Institute publishes an “Agenda for Action” reflecting the ideas discussed during the forum.

Each year, the forum identifies a theme broad enough to incorporate a variety of views and produce practical recommendations. The 2013 forum focused on “How to Promote Freedom and Democracy Effectively.” Vice President Biden headlined the event, taking part in  conversation with Senator McCain on national and international issues, from gun control to immigration to the global economy. The 2019 forum, the first since McCain's death, was opened by his son, Jack, also a Navy pilot.

Debate and Decision Series
The institute sponsors a series of debates. Among the issues debated include U.S. policy on: Syria, Afghanistan, Iran, the defense budget, Egypt and the Arab Spring, drone warfare, and Russia. The debates are followed by a private, non-attribution discussion among the debaters and the senior policymakers present. This creates a “safe environment” for political leaders to discuss issues honestly and without fear of political vulnerability or backlash.

The debates have been expanded to other cities including Phoenix. Each debate brings in about 250 audience members and reaches thousands of people via live-streaming, television, and online viewers. The debates have featured speakers from the Brookings Institution, the American Enterprise Institute, The New Republic, The Atlantic, CNN, Fox News, the Wilson Center, Pepperdine University, Human Rights Watch, the Cato Institute, the Hoover Institution at Stanford University and the RAND Corporation.

Leadership Voices

The McCain Institute regularly invites senior leaders from the United States and around the world to share personal insights. The institute maintains a digital archive of these events, available online for students, journalists and scholars. Among the participants are New Jersey Governor Chris Christie, President Bill Clinton, former Israeli Prime Minister Ehud Olmert, former Latvian Defense Minister Artis Pabriks, former Georgian Foreign Minister Eka Tkeshelashvili, and former President of Colombia Álvaro Uribe.

Washington Policy Design Studio
The Washington Policy Design Studio brings Arizona State University students to Washington, D.C., for a semester of intensive class work on the art of foreign policy-making, combined with a D.C. internship.

References

External links
 

Arizona State University
John McCain
Foreign policy and strategy think tanks in the United States
Non-profit organizations based in Washington, D.C.
2012 establishments in Washington, D.C.
Think tanks based in Washington, D.C.
Think tanks established in 2012